The Girimaidan railway station in the Indian state of West Bengal, serves Kharagpur, India in Paschim Medinipur district. It is on the Kharagpur–Bankura–Adra line.

References

External links
 
Trains at Girimaidan

Railway stations in Paschim Medinipur district
Kolkata Suburban Railway stations